Rwankona is a village in the Commune of Bururi in Bururi Province in southern Burundi. It is located just to the northwest of Buta.

References

External links
Satellite map at Maplandia.com

Populated places in Bururi Province